Bianco is a town and comune in the Province of Reggio Calabria, in southern Italy.

Bianco may also refer to:

People
 Bianco (surname)

Given name
 Bianco (harpist) (1927–2007), American harpist
 Bianco Bianchi (1917–1997), Italian cyclist
 Bianco Spartaco Gambini (1893–1966), Brazilian footballer
 Bianco Luno (1795–1852), Danish entrepreneur
 Bianco da Siena (1350–1399), Italian mystic poet and an imitator of Jacopone da Todi

Other uses
 BIANCO, an independent anti-corruption office in Madagascar
 Mont Blanc
 Pizzeria Bianco, a pizza restaurant in downtown Phoenix, Arizona